M-segment is the European segments for passenger cars described as "multi purpose vehicles". It covers multi-purpose vehicles, minivans and cargo vans. The  minivans (also called MPVs or passenger vans) often have removable rear seating to provide flexibility for transporting passengers or cargo, while the cargo vans (also called light commercial vehicles) are primarily designed for transporting cargo and therefore do not have rear seats.

In the recent past, the M-segment was increasing in volume year over year in Europe; in 2015, it is consolidated as the fourth most popular segment (11.5% of the overall market after C-segment, J-segment and B-segment).

Multi-purpose vehicles (MPVs)

Small MPVs 
As of 2018, the five highest selling small MPVs in Europe were the Fiat 500L, Ford B-Max, Hyundai ix20, Opel/Vauxhall Meriva and Kia Venga.

Mid-sized MPVs 
As of 2021, the five highest selling mid-sized MPVs in Europe were the Volkswagen Touran, Mercedes-Benz B-Class, Renault Grand Scenic, BMW 2 Series Active Tourer and Citroen C4 Picasso.

Large MPVs 
As of 2021, the five highest selling large MPVs in Europe were the Ford S-Max, Volkswagen Sharan, SEAT Alhambra, Ford Galaxy and Renault Espace.

Passenger vans

Small passenger vans 
As of 2021, the five highest selling small passenger vans in Europe were the Citroën Berlingo Multispace, Volkswagen Caddy Life, Peugeot Rifter, Opel/Vauxhall Combo Tour and Toyota Proace City Verso.

Large passenger vans 
As of 2021, the five highest selling large passenger vans in Europe were the Volkswagen Transporter Multivan, Ford Tourneo Custom, Mercedes-Benz V-Class/Vito Tourer, Opel/Vauxhall Zafira Life and Peugeot Traveller.

Light commercial vehicles (LCVs) 
As of 2014, the five highest selling light commercial vehicles in Europe were the Ford Transit, Mercedes-Benz Sprinter, Volkswagen Crafter, Citroën Jumper and Fiat Ducato.

See also 
 Euro Car Segment
 Car classifications
 Commercial vehicle
 Pickup truck

References 

Euro car segments